Atherton is an electoral ward in the Metropolitan Borough of Wigan, Greater Manchester, England. It forms part of Wigan Metropolitan Borough Council, as well as the parliamentary constituency of Bolton West.

Councillors 
The ward is represented by three councillors: James Paul Watson (Ind), Stuart Gerrard (Ind), and Jamie Hodgkinson (Ind).

References

Wigan Metropolitan Borough Council Wards